Lesticus brevilabris is a species of ground beetle in the subfamily Pterostichinae. It was described by Emden in 1936.

References

Lesticus
Beetles described in 1936